Ou (Majuscule: ,) is a ligature of the Greek letters ο and υ which was frequently used in Byzantine manuscripts.  This ligature is still seen today on icon artwork in Greek Orthodox churches, and sometimes in graffiti or other forms of informal or decorative writing.

Usage 
Today, in Western Abenaki, "ô" is preferred, and in Algonquin, "w" is preferred.

An ou ligature much different in form (with the two letters side-by-side as in most ligatures, as opposed to one on top of the other) was used in the Initial Teaching Alphabet.

The ligature, in both majuscule and minuscule forms, is occasionally used to represent minuscule of "У" in the Romanian Transitional Alphabet, as the glyph for monograph Uk (ꙋ) is rarely available in font sets.

Computer encoding 
In Unicode, it is encoded for use in Latin as "Latin Capital Script OU" (U+0222 Ȣ) and "Latin Small Letter OU" (U+0223, ȣ) in the Latin Extended-B range, and for use in Cyrillic as Cyrillic letter monograph Uk (uppercase U+A64A, Ꙋ, lowercase U+A64B, ꙋ), in addition to now deprecated "Cyrillic letter Uk" (uppercase U+0478, Ѹ, lowercase U+0479, ѹ), which may be realized with the "о" and "у" either side by side or combined vertically.

Despite the ligature's origin in Greek, there is no separate provision for its encoding in the Greek script, because it was deemed to be a mere ligature on the font level but not a separate underlying character. A proposal for encoding it as "Greek letter ou" was made in 1998, but was rejected.

References

Ou
Ou
Vowel letters